This article presents lists of the literary events and publications in the 11th century.



Events
c. 1000–1025 – The only surviving manuscript of Beowulf is written.
1007 – The Book of Kells is probably stolen from the Abbey of Kells in Ireland for several months.
1016 – The Icelandic skald Bersi Skáldtorfuson is captured at the naval Battle of Nesjar and imprisoned.
c. 1022 – Nannayya, Aadi Kavi ("the first poet"), begins work on Andhra Mahabharatam, a translation of the Mahabharata into Telugu and the first work of Telugu literature.
1029 – Sultan Mahmud of Ghazni orders the library of Rey in Persia to be burned and all books to be deemed as heretical.
1070
The Temple of Literature, Hanoi, is founded in the Vietnamese capital.
King Bleddyn ap Cynfyn enacts new laws regulating the activities of Welsh bards and musicians.
1080–1086 – The Chinese poet and polymath Su Shi is sent into internal exile for political reasons. During this period he writes the first and second Chibifu ( "The Red Cliffs").
1086 – Poet-ruler of Al-Andalus, Al-Mu'tamid ibn Abbad, kills his fellow-poet, former lover and vizier Muhammad ibn Ammar.

New works

1000
Al-Tasrif (كتاب التصريف لمن عجز عن التأليف The Method of Medicine), by Abu al-Qasim al-Zahrawi (Abulcasis)
The Remaining Signs of Past Centuries (کتاب الآثار الباقية عن القرون الخالية Kitāb al-āthār al-bāqiyah `an al-qurūn al-khāliyah), by Abū Rayḥān al-Bīrūnī
c. 1000 – The Battle of Maldon (Old English)
c. 1008–10 – The Diary of Lady Murasaki (紫式部日記 Murasaki Shikibu Nikki), by Murasaki Shikibu (in kana script)
1010: March 8 (completed) – Shahnameh by Ferdowsi
1011 – Manual (Enchiridion) by Byrhtferth of Ramsey Abbey
1012–18 – Chronicon Thietmari by Thietmar of Merseburg
By 1018 – Confessio Theologica by John of Fécamp
1019 – Legenda Sancti Goeznovii by 'William'
By 1021 – The Tale of Genji (源氏物語 Genji monogatari), by Murasaki Shikibu
1021 – Book of Optics by Alhazen
1025 – The Canon of Medicine by Avicenna
1027 – The Book of Healing by Avicenna
1026–46 – Historiarum libri quinque ab anno incarnationis DCCCC usque ad annum MXLIV (History in five books from AD 900–1044) by Rodulfus Glaber
c. 1040–44 – Wujing Zongyao (武經總要, "Collection of the Most Important Military Techniques") by Zeng Gongliang, Ding Du, Yang Weide and others
c. 1040–53 – Mukhtar al-hikam wa mahasin al-kalim (Choice Maxims and Finest Sayings), by al-Mubashshir ibn Fatiq
1041–42 – Encomium Emmae Reginae probably by a Flemish monk of the Abbey of Saint Bertin, Saint-Omer
Mid-11th century – Sponsus
After c. 1040 – Le Chanson de Roland (The Song of Roland), original version, perhaps by Turold
c. 1049 – Chronicle of Nantes (Chronicon Namnetense) concludes
c. 1054–76 – Cançó de Santa Fe by an anonymous clerk in a Catalan dialect of Old Occitan
After 1056 – Liber precum variarum by John of Fécamp
1064 – Liniantu (歷年圖 "Chart of Successive Years") by Sima Guang
1066 – by Sima Guang
Leipian (類篇 Classified Chapters; Chinese dictionary)
Tongzhi (通志 Comprehensive Records (of Chinese history))
1070 – Kutadgu Bilig (The Wisdom Which Brings Good Fortune), by Yusuf Khass Hajib of Balasagun in the Kara-Khanid Khanate (Uyghur language)
c. 1070 – Hamamatsu Chūnagon Monogatari (浜松中納言物語), attributed to Takasue's Daughter
c. 1070 – Kathāsaritsāgara by Somadeva 
1073–76 – Gesta Hammaburgensis ecclesiae pontificum by Adam of Bremen
c. 1075 – Vita sancta Servatii and Miracula sancta Servatii (life and miracles of Saint Servatius) by Jocundus
1077 – Monologion (Monologue) by Anselm
1077–78 – Proslogion (Address) by Anselm
1084 –Zizhi Tongjian (資治通鑑; Comprehensive Mirror to Aid in Government) by Sima Guang
1086 – Domesday Book
c. 1087 – Almanac by Abū Ishāq Ibrāhīm al-Zarqālī (Arzachel)
1088 – Dream Pool Essays (夢溪筆談, Mèng Xī Bǐ Tán) by Shen Kuo
1098 – Elucidarium by Honorius Augustodunensis
Late 11th century
The Incoherence of the Philosophers (تهافت الفلاسفة) by Al-Ghazali
Mabinogion (possible date)
Rubaiyat of Omar Khayyam (Persian)
Siyasatnama (سياست نامه) by Nizam al-Mulk (Persian)
11th or 12th century – Betha Meic Creiche (Life of Mac Creiche, in Middle Irish)
c. 11th century – The Records of Origin on Things and Affairs (事物纪原), by Gao Cheng
Heian period
Sarashina Nikki (更級日記, a travel diary) by Takasue's Daughter
Yoru no Nezame (夜の寝覚, Wakefulness at Night), attributed to Takasue's Daughter, but perhaps written after 1086

Births
c. 1001 – Wallada bint al-Mustakfi, al-Andalusian poet and princess (died 1091)
c. 1003 – Ibn Zaydún, Arab poet (died 1071)
c. 1033 – Anselm of Canterbury, Aosta-born scholastic philosopher, archbishop and saint (died 1109)
1037: January 8 – Su Shi, Chinese poet (died 1101)
1040: February 22 – Rashi, French rabbinical scholar (died 1105)
1048: May 18 – Omar Khayyám, Persian philosopher, scientist and presumed poet (died 1131)
1078: Ibn Quzman, al-Andalusian poet (died 1160)

Deaths
1001 – Wang Yucheng, Chinese poet (born 954)
c. 1002 – Hrotsvitha, Saxon secular canoness and writer of Latin poetry and drama (born c. 935)
1029 – Koshikibu no Naishi (小式部内侍), Japanese waka poet
1037 – Avicenna (Ibn-Sīnā), Persian polymath
1064: August 15 – Ibn Hazm (al-Andalusī aẓ-Ẓāhirī), Andalusian polymath (born 994)
1079: February 22 – John of Fécamp, Italian-born Benedictine abbot and spiritual writer

In literature
Paul Kingsnorth's novel The Wake (2014) is set around the Norman conquest of England.

See also 
11th century in poetry
10th century in literature
12th century in literature
list of years in literature

References

 
Medieval literature
History of literature